Sindeok of Silla (died 917) (r. 912–917) was the 53rd ruler of the Korean kingdom of Silla. He was born to the Pak clan, and was the son of Daeachan Pak Ye-gyeom. He was chosen to succeed the childless King Hyogong, because he was a descendant of King Adalla (d. 184, the last Pak to sit on the Silla throne) and was also a son-in-law of King Heongang.

Reigning during the Later Three Kingdoms period, Sindeok was faced with constant attacks by the new kingdoms of Taebong and Hubaekje in the west.

Upon his death in 917, King Sindeok was buried near Juk Castle in Gyeongju.

Family
Parents
Father: Park Ye–gyeom (박예겸) 
Mother: Madame Jeonghwa (정화부인) 

Consorts and their respective issue:
Queen Uiseong of the Kim clan (의성왕후 김씨), daughter of Heongang of Silla
Son: Gyeongmyeong of Silla–was the 54th ruler of Silla
Son: Gyeongae of Silla–was the 55th ruler of Silla

In Samguk Yusa (삼국유사) recorded that Park Ye-gyeom was the adoptive father and Park Moon-won (박문원)  was the Biological father of Sindeok.

See also
List of Korean monarchs
List of Silla people
Later Three Kingdoms of Korea

References

Silla rulers
9th-century births
917 deaths
10th-century rulers in Asia